Thomas Richard Potts (November 20, 1915 – August 10, 1944), known professionally as Richard Fiske, was an American film actor. He appeared in over 80 films between 1938 and 1942.

Career
Born Thomas Richard Potts, Fiske was born to Frank and Bernice Potts. The tall, handsome young actor signed a contract with Columbia Pictures in 1938, and appeared regularly in the studio's "B" pictures, serials, and short subjects, including major roles in the popular serials The Spider's Web (1938) and Flying G-Men (1939), frequent castings in the Blondie, The Lone Wolf, and Boston Blackie series, and equally frequent work with short-subject comedians Charley Chase, Andy Clyde, and Buster Keaton.

Fiske is best known by modern viewers for his portrayals of neurotic foils to The Three Stooges. Perhaps his most familiar role is that of the irate husband-turned-drill sergeant in 1940's Boobs in Arms. This performance would be recycled three years later in Dizzy Pilots. His last film role was Ginger Rogers' fiancee in the Billy Wilder comedy The Major and the Minor.

Death
Fiske's brief acting career was cut short when he was drafted into the U.S. Army in 1942. He was killed in action two years later at La Croix-Avranchin, while serving within the 9th Infantry Regiment (United States) 2nd Infantry Division. 1st Lieutenant Fiske (Potts) was 28 years of age.

Fiske was posthumously awarded the Purple Heart, Bronze Star Medal, and several other military honors. He is buried at Brittany American Cemetery and Memorial, Basse-Normandie, France.

Selected filmography

 Juvenile Court (1938) - Spectator at Accident (uncredited)
 Girls' School (1938) - Sugar' - Myras First Dance Partner (uncredited)
 The Spider's Web (1938, Serial) - Jackson
 In Early Arizona (1938) - Gambler (uncredited)
 Blondie (1938) - Nelson - Dithers' Employee (uncredited)
 The Little Adventuress (1938) - Dick Horton
 Homicide Bureau (1939) - Hank
 Flying G-Men (1939, Serial) - Bart Davis
 Blondie Meets the Boss (1939) - Nelson
 Romance of the Redwoods (1939) - Logger (uncredited)
 North of the Yukon (1939) - Mart Duncan
 Outside These Walls (1939) - Prisoner (uncredited)
 Missing Daughters (1939) - 2nd Attendant (uncredited)
 Pest from the West (1939, Short) - Ferdinand the Bullfighter
 Good Girls Go to Paris (1939) - Student (uncredited)
 The Man from Sundown (1939) - Tom Kellogg
 Overland with Kit Carson (1939, Serial) - Lieutenant David Brent
 Behind Prison Gates (1939) - Agent Lyman
 Konga, the Wild Stallion (1939) - Steve Calhoun
 Parents on Trial (1939) - Lawrence Hastings
 Oily to Bed, Oily to Rise (1939, Short) - Mr. Johnson - Farmer (uncredited)
 The Taming of the West (1939) - Blacksmith (uncredited)
 Scandal Sheet (1939) - Student
 Blondie Brings Up Baby (1939) - Dithers' Employee (uncredited)
 Three Sappy People (1939, Short) - Party Guest (uncredited)
 The Stranger from Texas (1939) - Ned Browning
 My Son Is Guilty (1939) - Mac (uncredited)
 You Nazty Spy! (1940, Short) - Mr. Ixnay (uncredited)
 The Lone Wolf Strikes (1940) - Officer in Chase Car (uncredited)
 Convicted Woman (1940) - Hank (uncredited)
 Five Little Peppers at Home (1940) - Aunt Martha's Chauffeur (uncredited)
 Pioneers of the Frontier (1940) - Henchman Bart
 The Man from Tumbleweeds (1940) - Ranger Slash (Henchman Slash in credits)
 Men Without Souls (1940) - Crowley
 Island of Doomed Men (1940) - Hale (uncredited)
 Texas Stagecoach (1940) - Workman (uncredited)
 The Lone Wolf Meets a Lady (1940) - Detective Jackson (uncredited)
 Before I Hang (1940) - Mandish (uncredited)
 Glamour for Sale (1940) - Club Bartender (uncredited)
 Prairie Schooners (1940) - Adams
 So You Won't Talk (1940) - Cop (uncredited)
 Blondie Plays Cupid (1940) - Nelson (uncredited)
 Girls Under 21 (1940) - Cop (uncredited)
 Arizona (1940) - Teamster (uncredited)
 The Lone Wolf Keeps a Date (1940) - Croupier With Check (uncredited)
 The Phantom Submarine (1940) - Cab Driver (uncredited)
 This Thing Called Love (1940) - Ship officer (uncredited)
 Boobs in Arms (1940, Short) - Sergeant Hugh Dare
 The Devil Commands (1941) - Dr. Richard Sayles
 Across the Sierras (1941) - Larry Armstrong
 Meet Boston Blackie (1941) - Police Officer (uncredited)
 Outlaws of the Panhandle (1941) - Henchman Britt
 North from the Lone Star (1941) - Clint Wilson
 They Dare Not Love (1941) - Third Photographer (uncredited)
 All the World's a Stooge (1941, Short) - Dr. I. Yankum (uncredited)
 Time Out for Rhythm (1941) - Customer (uncredited)
 Blondie in Society (1941) - Nelson, Dithers' Employee (uncredited)
 The Medico of Painted Springs (1941) - Kentucky Lane
 The Son of Davy Crockett (1941) - Jesse Gordon
 The Richest Man in Town (1941) - Son (uncredited)
 I Was a Prisoner on Devil's Island (1941) - Georges (uncredited)
 Texas (1941) - Red, Fight Timekeeper (uncredited)
 The Officer and the Lady (1941) - Ace Quinn
 In the Sweet Pie and Pie (1941, Short) - Diggins (uncredited)
 Go West, Young Lady (1941) - Gang Member (uncredited)
 The Lone Wolf Takes a Chance (1941) - Brakeman (uncredited)
 Valley of the Sun (1942) - Lieutenant Burke (uncredited)
 Perils of the Royal Mounted (1942, Serial) - Constable Brady
 The Major and the Minor (1942) - Will Duffy (final film role)
 Dizzy Pilots (1943, Short) - Sergeant (archive footage)

References

External links
 
 Richard Fiske at threestooges.net

1915 births
1944 deaths
American male film actors
United States Army personnel killed in World War II
20th-century American male actors